Albert Siu is an internist and geriatrician and the Ellen and Howard C. Katz Chairman and Professor of the Brookdale Department of Geriatrics and Palliative Medicine at Mount Sinai Hospital in New York City. He is also the director of the Geriatric Research, Education, and Clinical Center at the James J. Peters VA Medical Center in The Bronx, a senior associate editor of Health Services Research, a senior fellow of the Brookdale Foundation and a former trustee of the Nathan Cummings Foundation.

Siu is the author of 9 book chapters and more than 100 peer-reviewed publications. He has co-authored 50 publications for the United States Preventive Services Task Force. His department at Mount Sinai treats nearly 5,000 elderly patients a year and houses a number of programs including the Martha Stewart Center for Living, the Hertszberg Palliative Care Institute, the National Palliative Care Research Center, the Medicare Innovations Collaborative and the Mount Sinai Visiting Doctors.  The Department partnerships include the James J. Peters VA Medical Center in the Bronx and the Long Island Jewish Home.

Biography
Siu was born in Havana, Cuba, of Chinese Cuban descent. He graduated from the University of California at Berkeley with a degree in biochemistry in 1976. He earned his medical degree from Yale School of Medicine in 1980 and completed a master's degree in public health at UCLA School of Medicine in 1986.

After completing a residency in internal medicine at UCLA in 1983, Siu remained there as assistant professor of medicine, with a joint appointment as health services researcher for the RAND Corporation in Santa Monica, where he was the author of 20 monographs.

Siu served as chief of the Division of Geriatric Medicine at UCLA from 1989 until 1993, when he was named deputy commissioner in the New York State Department of Health. Concurrently, from 1994 to 1995, Siu was associate professor of health policy and management at the University of Albany School of Public Health. In 1995 Siu was named professor of health policy at the Icahn School of Medicine at Mount Sinai in New York. In 1998 he was named Mount Sinai's Clifford Spingarn, MD Professor of Medicine and chief of the Division of General Internal Medicine and medical director of the Primary Care and Medical Services Care Center. In 2003 he was named the Ellen and Howard Katz Professor of Geriatrics and Palliative Medicine.

Grants
National Institute on Aging, K24 AG00918, Patient-oriented Research in Aging
National Institutes of Health, K30 HL04131, Clinical Research Curriculum Award
Use of VA and Medicare Services by Older Veterans with New Disability, VA Health Services Research and Development, IIR 03-226

Publications
Partial list:
Using nontraditional risk factors in coronary heart disease risk assessment: U.S. Preventive Services Task Force recommendation statement. U.S. Preventive Services Task Force. Annals of Internal Medicine. 6 October 2009;151(7):474-82. 
Health literacy and cognitive performance in older adults. Federman AD, Sano M, Wolf MS, Siu AL, Halm EA. Journal of the American Geriatric Society. 2009 Aug;57(8):1475-80. 
Awareness of pharmaceutical cost-assistance programs among inner-city seniors. Federman AD, Safran DG, Keyhani S, Cole H, Halm EA, Siu AL. American Journal of Pharmacotherapy. 2009 Apr;7(2):117-29. 
Cognitive decline among patients with chronic obstructive pulmonary disease. Hung WW, Wisnivesky JP, Siu AL, Ross JS. American Journal of Respiratory and Critical care Medicine. 15 July 2009;180(2):134-7. 
Electronic health record components and the quality of care. Keyhani S, Hebert PL, Ross JS, Federman A, Zhu CW, Siu AL. Med Care. 2008 Dec;46(12):1267-72. 
Aspirin for the prevention of cardiovascular disease: U.S. Preventive Services Task Force recommendation statement. US Preventive Services Task Force. Annals of Internal Medicine. 17 March 2009;150(6):396-404. 
Screening for skin cancer: U.S. Preventive Services Task Force recommendation statement. U.S. Preventive Services Task Force. Annals of Internal Medicine. 3 February 2009;150(3):188-93. 
The underuse of overuse research. Keyhani S, Siu AL. Health Service Research. 2008 Dec;43(6):1923-30.  
The ironic business case for chronic care in the acute care setting. Siu AL, Spragens LH, Inouye SK, Morrison RS, Leff B. Health Aff (Millwood). 2009 Jan-Feb;28(1):113-25. 
A novel interdisciplinary analgesic program reduces pain and improves function in older adults after orthopedic surgery. Morrison RS, Flanagan S, Fischberg D, Cintron A, Siu AL. Journal of the American Geriatric Society. 2009 Jan;57(1):1-10. 
Low levels of awareness of pharmaceutical cost-assistance programs among inner-city seniors. Federman AD, Safran DG, Keyhani S, Siu AL, Halm EA. JAMA. 24 September 2008;300(12):1412-4. 
The association of race, gender, and comorbidity with mortality and function after hip fracture. Penrod JD, Litke A, Hawkes WG, Magaziner J, Doucette JT, Koval KJ, Silberzweig SB, Egol KA, Siu AL. J Gerontol A Biol Sci Med Sci. 2008 Aug;63(8):867-72. 
Beliefs about generic drugs among elderly adults in hospital-based primary care practices. Iosifescu A, Halm EA, McGinn T, Siu AL, Federman AD. Patient Educ Couns. 2008 Nov;73(2):377-83. 
Universal screening for hearing loss in newborns: US Preventive Services Task Force recommendation statement. US Preventive Services Task Force. Pediatrics. 2008 Jul;122(1):143-8. Review. 
Screening for gestational diabetes mellitus: U.S. Preventive Services Task Force recommendation statement. U.S. Preventive Services Task Force. Annals of Internal Medicine. 20 May 2008;148(10):759-65. 
Use of recommended ambulatory care services: is the Veterans Affairs quality gap narrowing? Ross JS, Keyhani S, Keenan PS, Bernheim SM, Penrod JD, Boockvar KS, Federman AD, Krumholz HM, Siu AL. Archives of Internal Medicine. 12 May 2008;168(9):950-8. 
Dual use of Veterans Affairs services and use of recommended ambulatory care. Ross JS, Keyhani S, Keenan PS, Bernheim SM, Penrod JD, Boockvar KS, Krumholz HM, Siu AL. Med Care. 2008 Mar;46(3):309-16. 
How much time do physicians spend providing care outside office visits? Farber J, Siu A, Bloom P. Annals of Internal Medicine. 20 November 2007;147(10):693-8. 
Use of preventive care by elderly male veterans receiving care through the Veterans Health Administration, Medicare fee-for-service, and Medicare HMO plans. Keyhani S, Ross JS, Hebert P, Dellenbaugh C, Penrod JD, Siu AL. American Journal of Public Health. 2007 Dec;97(12):2179-85. 
Current processes of the U.S. Preventive Services Task Force: refining evidence-based recommendation development. Guirguis-Blake J, Calonge N, Miller T, Siu A, Teutsch S, Whitlock E; U.S. Preventive Services Task Force. Annals of Internal Medicine. 17 July 2007;147(2):117-22.

References

External links
Mount Sinai Hospital homepage
Icahn School of Medicine at Mount Sinai homepage
Video: Martha Stewart Living. Martha Stewart discusses the future of geriatric care with Drs. Albert Siu and Audrey Chun
Early Ambulation After Hip Fracture: Effects on Function and Mortality An examination  of how immobility is associated with function and mortality in patients with hip fracture. Albert L. Siu, MD, MSPH; Joan D. Penrod, PhD; Kenneth S. Boockvar, MD, MS; Kenneth Koval, MD; Elton Strauss, MD; R. Sean Morrison, MD
Avoidance of health care services because of cost: Impact of the Medicare savings program Federman, Alex D.; Vladeck, Bruce C.; Siu, Albert L. (2005). Health Affairs 24 (1): 263-270. .

American geriatricians
Living people
Icahn School of Medicine at Mount Sinai faculty
University of California, Berkeley alumni
Yale School of Medicine alumni
American people of Cuban descent
American people of Chinese descent
Cuban people of Chinese descent
UCLA School of Public Health alumni
Year of birth missing (living people)
Members of the National Academy of Medicine